SAC or Sac may refer to:

Organizations

Education
 Santa Ana College, California, US
 San Antonio College, Texas, US
 St. Andrew's College, Aurora, Canada
 Students' Administrative Council, University of Toronto, Canada
 SISD Student Activities Complex, in El Paso, Texas, US
 School-assessed coursework for Victorian Certificate of Education
 Student Activity Complex, in Laredo, Texas, US

Government and military
 NATO Strategic Airlift Capability, multinational transport aircraft initiative
Senior Aircraftman, a Royal Air Force rank 
 Senior Assistant Commissioner, a rank in the police of Singapore and Malaysia
 Southern Air Command (India), of the Indian Air Force
 Special Agent in Charge of a criminal investigation
 State Administration Council, governing Myanmar after the 2021 coup d'état

China
 Second Artillery Corps, later the People's Liberation Army Rocket Force, China
 Shenyang Aircraft Corporation, Chinese aircraft manufacturer
 Standardization Administration of China
 Securities Association of China

United States
 Special Activities Center of the CIA
 California State Prison, Sacramento
 Strategic Air Command, a nuclear-armed force active 1946-1992 
 President's Science Advisory Committee

Sports
 Sacramento Kings, Basketball team, California, US 
 Sooner Athletic Conference
 South Atlantic Conference
 Swiss Alpine Club

Other organizations
 Central Organisation of the Workers of Sweden (in Swedish: Sveriges Arbetares Centralorganisation, SAC - Syndikalisterna) 
 S.A.C. Capital Advisors, a hedge fund managed by Steven A. Cohen
 Satélite Argentino Científico, Argentine research satellites of Comisión Nacional de Actividades Espaciales
 Scottish Arbitration Centre
 Seoul Arts Center, South Korea
 Service d'Action Civique, a Gaullist organisation
 Shakespeare Authorship Coalition,'S A C', Claremont,California
 Singapore Accountancy Commission
 Societas Apostolatus Catholici, a Catholic religious congregation
Soldiers of Aryan Culture, an American white supremacist prison gang
 Songwriters Association of Canada
 Space Applications Centre, India
 State Affairs Commission of North Korea
 Sveriges Arbetares Centralorganisation, a trade union federation in Sweden
 Superior Art Creations, a computer art scene group
 The Society of Arts and Crafts of Boston, US, since 1897

Science and technology
 S-Allyl cysteine, a chemical constituent of garlic
 Sac spider, a taxon
 Source of activation confusion model, in psychology
 Spindle assembly checkpoint, in biology
 Tin-silver-copper (SnAgCu), a solder formulation
 Supplemental access control, electronic travel document security features
 Soluble adenylyl cyclase

Computing
 SA-C programming language
 S.A.C. (control code), in the 1950s FIELDATA
 SAC programming language
 Special Administration Console of Windows Emergency Management Services
 Strict Avalanche Criterion in cryptography
 Selected Areas in Cryptography, an annual cryptography conference
 Symposium on Applied Computing, an annual conference
 Spatial Audio Coding or MPEG Surround

Biology and medicine
SAC (gene)
 Amniotic sac
 Anal sac or anal gland
 Bursa sac or bursa
 Chorion
 Dural sac, a structure of spinal cord
 Egg sac, the reproductive structure of a spider
 Fecal sac
 Gestational sac
 Greater sac
 Gular skin or throat sac
 Ink sac
 Lacrimal sac, eye-and-nose-associated structure
 Lesser sac
 Ovule or embryo sac
 Pleural cavity or pleural sac
 Synovial sac, joint component
 Venom sac, in venom-secreting animals
 Vestibular sacs (disambiguation)
 Viscid sac
 Vocal sac
 Yolk sac

Transportation
 Sacramento Executive Airport (IATA code)
 Sacramento Valley Rail Station (Amtrak station code)
 St Albans City railway station (National Rail station code)
 Sports activity coupe, a BMW class of cars
 Self-adjusting clutch in the BMW 5 Series

Places

United States
 Sac City, Iowa
 Sac County, Iowa
 Sac River, Missouri
 Nickname of Sacramento, California

Other uses
 Sač, a baking vessel in the Balkans and the Middle East
 Ghost in the Shell: Stand Alone Complex (and GITS: SAC 2nd GIG), a Japanese TV series
 Sac language (ISO 639:sac)
 Sac (people), a North American tribe
 Sacrifice bunt, in baseball
 Slow air chamber, of a Native American flute
 Special Area of Conservation, in the EU and UK
 Summit Athletic Conference (IHSAA), Fort Wayne, Indiana, US
 SAC-46 (handgun), pistol, USA, 1945

See also
 Sack (disambiguation)
 

Language and nationality disambiguation pages